East Baltimore Midway is a neighborhood in the Eastern district of Baltimore, Maryland. Its boundaries are the south side of 25th Street, the east side of Greenmount Avenue, the west side of Harford Road, and the north side of North Avenue.

The neighborhood lies East of Barclay, North of Oliver, South of Coldstream-Homestead-Montebello, and West of Clifton Park. Though the area was once considered middle-class, it has in the last century experienced economic depression, housing abandonment, and increased crime. The neighborhood was effected by the Baltimore riot of 1968. Its residents are largely poor and working-class African Americans.

External links
Demographics from Baltimore Neighborhood Indicators Alliance 
Neighborhood Information from Baltimore City Website 
Baltimore '68: Riots and Rebirth

 
African-American history in Baltimore
Neighborhoods in Baltimore
Poverty in Maryland
Working-class culture in Baltimore